The Aarhus–Randers line or the Aarhus–Randers railway is a  long standard gauge, double track railway line in Denmark which runs between the cities of Aarhus and Randers in East Jutland. It constitutes a section of Den Østjyske Længdebane, the railway line through the Jutland Peninsula from Padborg to Frederikshavn.

The railway opened in 1862. The line is owned and maintained by Rail Net Denmark and served with passenger trains by the Danish State Railways (DSB) and Arriva.

References

Citations

Bibliography

Further reading

External links 

 Banedanmark – government agency responsible for maintenance and traffic control of most of the Danish railway network
 DSB – largest Danish train operating company
 Arriva – British multinational public transport company operating bus and train services in Denmark
 Danske Jernbaner – website with information on railway history in Denmark

Railway lines in Denmark
Railway lines opened in 1862
1862 establishments in Denmark
Rail transport in the Central Denmark Region